The name Baron de Hirsch Cemetery may refer to these Jewish cemeteries: 

 Baron de Hirsch Cemetery (Halifax), in Halifax, Nova Scotia
 Baron de Hirsch Cemetery (Montreal), in Montreal, Quebec
 Baron Hirsch Cemetery, in Staten Island, New York